Anatole Cédric Roméo Ngamukol (born 15 January 1988) is a professional footballer who plays as a forward for  club Paris 13 Atletico. Born in France, he has received call-ups to teams representing the Democratic Republic of the Congo and Equatorial Guinea in the past.

Club career
Ngamukol began his career with Reims being promoted in 2007 to the French Championnat National team. After three years with Reims senior side he signed a contract with Real Zaragoza B in January 2009. On 20 August 2009, Palencia signed him on a free transfer until June 2010.

Ngamukol helped Reims win the 2017–18 Ligue 2, helping promote them to the Ligue 1 for the 2018–19 season.

In June 2018, he was forced to train separately, and in July he was one of three players Reims were looking to transfer. In December he filed a complaint against the club for "harassment".

On 30 January 2019, Ngamukol joined 3. Liga side Fortuna Köln. He left the club at the end of the season and remained without club until February 2020, when he joined Fréjus Saint-Raphaël in the Championnat National 2.

In August 2020, Ngamukol signed for Paris 13 Atletico, a team playing in the fourth tier of French football.

International career
When Ngamukol played in Spain for Palencia, he was a teammate of Equatoguinean international Benjamín Zarandona, who invited him to join Equatorial Guinea team. In April 2010, he was called up by the Equatoguinean national under-20 football team for the second match against Gabon in the African Youth Championship 2011 Qualifying preliminary round. Although his age was then 22, Ngamukol was selected as one of the three over-age players allowed to be included.

In July 2010, Ngamukol received his first call-up to the Equatoguinean senior team, to play a friendly match against Morocco on 11 August 2010, but he did not travel to the game. Because of this, Ngamukol is still also available to be selected by the senior teams of France and DR Congo, and in September 2014, he was called-up by the DR Congo.

Honours
Reims
 Ligue 2: 2017–18

Grasshoppers
 Swiss Cup: 2012–13
Paris 13 Atletico

 Championnat National 2: 2021–22

References

External links
 
 

1988 births
Living people
Naturalized citizens of Equatorial Guinea
Sportspeople from Aubervilliers
French sportspeople of Democratic Republic of the Congo descent
Equatoguinean footballers
Democratic Republic of the Congo footballers
French footballers
Association football forwards
Equatorial Guinea youth international footballers
Tercera División players
Ligue 2 players
Championnat National 2 players
Swiss Super League players
Swiss Challenge League players
3. Liga players
Red Star F.C. players
Stade de Reims players
Real Zaragoza B players
CF Palencia footballers
US Roye-Noyon players
FC Wil players
FC Thun players
Grasshopper Club Zürich players
SC Fortuna Köln players
ÉFC Fréjus Saint-Raphaël players
Paris 13 Atletico players
Black French sportspeople
French expatriate footballers
French expatriate sportspeople in Spain
Expatriate footballers in Spain
French expatriate sportspeople in Switzerland
Expatriate footballers in Switzerland
French expatriate sportspeople in Germany
Expatriate footballers in Germany
Footballers from Seine-Saint-Denis